Stephen Broadbent is a British sculptor, specialising in public art. He was born in Wroughton, Wiltshire in 1961 and educated at Liverpool Blue Coat School. In Liverpool he studied sculpture for four years under Arthur Dooley.

He has created public sculptures for communities across the UK and for international projects.  His sculptural practice is based upon meaningful placemaking, creating artworks which resonate with the environments in which they're placed.  This is often achieved through community collaboration, looking and listening to the stories a place has to tell, to create a unique design which becomes an integral part of its surroundings.

Significant works 

Broadbent contributed to the remodelling of Bridge Street in Warrington town centre, the site of the 1993 Warrington bomb attacks that killed two young children with a 'River Of Life' memorial. The design is intended to give hope for the future, and takes the form of a fountain - a "river" running down the street bringing healing and refreshment.

He has created two versions of the 'Reconciliation Triangle'.  The first, in 1989, represented connections between Liverpool, Glasgow and Dublin.  The second marked the legacy of the slave trade in the histories of Liverpool, Richmond, Virginia and Benin.  The sculptures in each connected city are identical (apart from the addition of low-relief bronze designs), marking the historical connections between locations whilst creating a new one in a process of healing.

His sculptures on Littlehaven Promenade, South Shields and Keel Square, Sunderland, both contributed to winning entries into the 2015 Northern Design Awards.

His largest work, 'Encounter', stands at junction 11 of the M62 Motorway at Birchwood, and incorporates telecommunications aerials within the metalwork.

List of works 

 Reconciliation, Liverpool, Glasgow, Belfast
 Celebration of Chester, Chester
 Water of Life, Chester Cathedral
 The River of Life, Warrington
 Coming Together, Liverpool
 Gateway markers, Sutton
 Seasons, Water Feature, Manchester Cathedral Gardens
 Pulling the Plug, Hyde Town Hall
 The Word, Methodist Publishing House 
 Empowerment, Lincoln
 Encounter, Birchwood
 Four Corners, King Mohammed IV Centre, Morocco
 Sculptural Seating, Fleming Square, Blackburn
 Faces of Liverpool, Beetham Tower Gardens, Liverpool
 Entrance Feature, Corbett Hospital
 Frank Whittle Memorial, Rugby
 Cleveleys Promenade
 Drift Park, Rhyl
 Sculpture Trail, West End Gardens, Morecambe
 Desks, Beetham Organisation, West Tower
 Reconciliation, Liverpool, Benin, Virginia
 Sheppard Worlock Memorial Sculpture, Liverpool
 Seed Sculpture, Liverpool Hope University
 John Newton Sculpture, Liverpool
 Seats, UCLAN Preston
 Tudor Square, Sheffield
 Growth, Saltney
 Casuals, Salford Quays
 Wayfinding Elements, Carlisle City Centre
 Planted, Stockbridge Village
 Newbridge town centre artworks
 Mythic Coast, Cleveleys
 Chaucer Totem, Sheffield
 Maesteg Bud, Maesteg
 "Eye" and "Sail" features, Littlehaven Promenade, South Shields
 Propellers of the City, Sunderland
 Lives Lived, Lives Lost, National Coal Mining Museum, Wakefield
 Coming Home, Gleneagles Golf Resort
 Garden of Pooled Talents, Sheffield University
 Linear Garden, Sci-Teach Daresbury
 The Voice of the City, Peterborough
 From Me To You, Blackpool Victoria Hospital
 The Eudaemonium, Altrincham
 Walking Together, Markham Vale

References

External links
 Artist's own website
2008 Roscoe Lecture for LJMU
The Mythic Coast: The Shell
Plan-it: Leopold Square, Sheffield
Liverpool Echo: The Sheppard-Worlock Memorial
Public Sector, Public Space: Working for Sunderland

British sculptors
British male sculptors
People from Wroughton
1961 births
Living people
People educated at Liverpool Blue Coat School